is a Japanese rekishi monogatari. It is believed to have been written in the early Kamakura period around 1195.  It is widely credited to Nakayama Tadachika but the actual writer is unknown.  It is the third book of the four mirror series.

It deals with the oldest time-period, starting with the legendary Emperor Jimmu and ending with Emperor Ninmyō.  It is told by a fictitious old woman who is visited by a bhikkhu while staying at Hase-dera. All the facts are taken from ca. 1150  by Kōen, the teacher of Hōnen.

"Mizukagami" refers to the reflective pool in Japanese gardens in which can be seen such things as bridges and cherry blossoms in its reflection.

See also
 Ōkagami
 Imakagami
 Masukagami

References
 Brownlee, John S.  Political Thought in Japanese Historical Writing:  from Koyjiki (712) to Tokushi Yoron (1712).  Waterloo, ON CA.  Wilfrid Laurier Press:  1991 (p. 52).

12th-century Japanese books
Early Middle Japanese texts
Kamakura-period history books